The Grab is an 2022 American documentary directed and produced by Gabriela Cowperthwaite. It follows investigative journalists at The Center for Investigative Reporting as they uncover efforts to control the most vital resources on earth.

Plot
It follows investigative journalists at The Center for Investigative Reporting as they uncover efforts to control the most vital resources on earth.

Production
Gabriela Cowperthwaite spent six years working on the film, after journalist Nathan Halverson reported on Smithfield Foods. Cowperthwaite was initially asked if the investigative process behind Halverson's articles would make a good film. Due to the sensitive material of the subject, the production team did doing diagnostics on computers, not talking in rooms with windows, and not talking about the film at all. They also used encrypted servers and hand-delivered all footage.

Release
The film had its world premiere at the 2022 Toronto International Film Festival on September 8, 2022. It also screened at DOC NYC on November 13, 2022.

Reception

References

External links
 

2022 films
2022 documentary films
American documentary films
Films directed by Gabriela Cowperthwaite